At the 2002 FIFA World Cup, each national association was required to name a squad of 23 players, expanded from 22 in previous tournaments.

The players' ages, caps and clubs are as of 31 May 2002, the opening day of the tournament.

Group A

Denmark
Head coach: Morten Olsen

France

Head coach: Roger Lemerre

Senegal

Head coach:  Bruno Metsu

Uruguay

Head coach: Víctor Púa

Group B

Paraguay

Head coach:  Cesare Maldini

Slovenia

Head coach: Srečko Katanec

 *Was expelled from the squad after the first game.
Note: caps for Yugoslavia are not counted.

South Africa

Head coach: Jomo Sono

Spain

Head coach: José Antonio Camacho

Group C

Brazil

Head coach: Luiz Felipe Scolari

China PR

Head coach:  Bora Milutinović

Costa Rica

Head coach: Alexandre Guimarães

Turkey

Head coach: Şenol Güneş

Group D

Poland

Head coach: Jerzy Engel

Portugal

Head coach: António Oliveira

South Korea

Head coach:  Guus Hiddink

United States

Head coach: Bruce Arena

Group E

Cameroon

Head coach:  Winfried Schäfer

Germany
Head coach: Rudi Völler

Republic of Ireland

Head coach: Mick McCarthy
Roy Keane left the squad before the tournament and was not replaced. See Saipan incident. Keane was technically still part of the named squad, and does appear in FIFA's official squad lists.

Saudi Arabia

Head coach: Nasser Al-Johar

Group F

Argentina
Head coach: Marcelo Bielsa

Originally, the squad was named with Ariel Ortega given shirt number 23 and Roberto Bonano number 24, as the Argentine Football Association had decided to retire the number 10 shirt in honour of Diego Maradona. FIFA, however, insisted that all squads were assigned with numbers ranging only from 1–23, prompting Argentina to amend their squad list.

England

Head coach:  Sven-Göran Eriksson

Nigeria

Head coach: Festus Onigbinde

Sweden

Head coaches: Lars Lagerbäck and Tommy Söderberg

Group G

Croatia

Head coach: Mirko Jozić

Note: caps for Yugoslavia are not counted.

Ecuador

Head coach:  Hernán Darío Gómez

Italy

Head coach: Giovanni Trapattoni

Mexico

Head coach: Javier Aguirre

Group H

Belgium
Head coach: Robert Waseige

Japan

Head coach:  Philippe Troussier

Russia

Head coach: Oleg Romantsev

Note: caps include those for USSR, CIS, and Russia, while those for other countries, such as Ukraine, are not counted.

Tunisia

Head coach: Ammar Souayah

Player representation by league

The Saudi Arabian squad was the only one made up entirely of players from their country's domestic league and the only one with no players from European clubs. The Cameroon squad were made up entirely of players employed by overseas clubs, the Irish squad was made up entirely by players in the English league. Although the Netherlands and Greece failed to qualify for the finals, their domestic leagues were represented by 18 and 10 players, respectively. Altogether, there were 43 national leagues who had players in the tournament.

References

 Planet World Cup website
 Sortable list of players at ScoreShelf.com website

Squads
FIFA World Cup squads